Ji'an railway station is a railway station on the Beijing–Kowloon railway serving the city of Ji'an. It is also the terminus of the freight-dedicated Haoji Railway. The station was completed in 1996.

References

Railway stations in Jiangxi
Railway stations in China opened in 1996